Sil and the Devil Seeds of Arodor is a 2019 direct-to-video mini-series produced by Reeltime Pictures. It stars the character of Sil from the television Doctor Who, as well as other elements licensed from the series. Nabil Shaban, who portrayed Sil in the original two serials, returned to the role.

The series received mixed reviews with critics, with praise for Nabil Shaban's performance and the script, but criticism for the sets and direction.

Plot 
Sil must use his wit and his cunning in order to survive his trial, where he will be sentenced to death if he is found guilty.

Production 
The series was announced on January 1, 2019. The idea for the production came from when Keith Barnfather was interviewing Nabil Shaban for a Myth Makers documentary. Shaban returned to star in the project. Philip Martin, who'd written the Doctor Who stories Vengeance on Varos and Mindwarp, which had featured Sil as the antagonist, also returned to script the film. Other returning Doctor Who stars included Sophie Aldred, Sakuntala Ramanee, and Christopher Ryan.

Originally, the project was supposed to be a 50-55 minute film, but Philip Martin's script ran for longer. The actors performances' also added extra time, leading to Barnfather re-organizing it into a series in the post-production edit. This would lead to a scene being cut, in order to preserve the episodic format.

The original script also had multiple references to the character of the Doctor. Due to the fact that Reeltime did not have the rights to the character, the references were removed.

A trailer for the film was released on October 7, 2019, on the official YouTube channel of Reeltime.

Release 
The film was released on DVD, Blu-Ray, and Video-on-Demand on November 4, 2019 in the UK

Novelisation

A novelisation of all four episodes was released in November 2019, published by Telos Publishing.

Reception 
Ed Fortune of Starburst wrote that the story was, "a labour of love and an entertaining one at that", although the low quality of the special effects were criticized. James Gent of We Are Cult praised both the script and Shaban's performance, writing, "Shaban is well-served by Martin’s script, reminding us exactly why Sil was worthy of a comeback, placing him in a series of situations where this amoral, unscrupulous, larger-than-life character has to continually use his wits for self-preservation."

Josh Snares, who had recently narrated a documentary for the official Doctor Who YouTube channel on the making of 2019 remake of Mission to the Unknown, was more critical of the production, criticizing Keith Barnfather's direction and the sets.

Labour Party politician Jeremy Corbyn was seen carrying a copy of the DVD while at a political rally, although it is not known what his opinion on the production was.

Sequel 
When asked of the possibility of bringing Sil back, Barnfather stated that, "My personal feeling is never say never again, but I think I’ve probably done everything I can with Sil in the lead."

However, on December 31, 2020, Reeltime announced that a sequel would be made, Vote Sil, using a script that Philip Martin had written before his death. This was confirmed in Martin's obituary in The Guardian.

References

External links 

 

Doctor Who spin-offs